The Max Planck Institute for Molecular Genetics is a research institute for molecular genetics based in Berlin, Germany. It is part of the Max Planck Institute network of the Max Planck Society for the Advancement of Science.

Departments and research groups 

 Department of Developmental Genetics (Bernhard Herrmann)
Department of Genome Regulation (Alexander Meissner)
Genome Regulation Group (Alexander Meissner)
Stem Cell Chromatin Group (Aydan Bulut-Karslioglu)
Lab for Human Brain & Neural Stem Cell Studies (Yechiel Elkabetz)
Precision Gene Control group (Denes Hnisz)
Cellular Phenotyping Group (Franz-Josef Müller)
Department of Computational Molecular Biology (Martin Vingron)
Transcriptional Regulation Group (Martin Vingron)
Mechanisms of Transcriptional Regulation Group (Sebastiaan H. Meijsing)
Chromatin Structure and Function Group (Sarah Kinkley)
Bioinformatics Group (Ralf Herwig)
Research Group Evolutionary Genomics (Peter Arndt)
Otto Warburg Laboratories
Quantitative RNA Biology (Tugce Aktas)
Epigenomics (Ho-Ryun Chung)
RNA Bioinformatics (Annalisa Marsico)
Nascent Transcription & Cell Differentiation (Andreas Mayer)
Regulatory Networks in Stem Cells (Edda Schulz)
Gene Regulation & System Biology of Cancer (Marie-Laure Yaspo)
Cell Signaling Dynamics (Zhike Zi)
Efficient Algorithms for Omics Data (Knut Reinert)
Scientific Services
Flow Cytometry Facility (Claudia Giesecke-Thiel)
Mass Spectrometry Facility (David Meierhofer)
Microscopy & Cryo-Electron Microscopy Unit (Thorsten Mielke)
Sequencing Core Facility (Bernd Timmermann)

References
 Institute Homepage
 https://www.mpg.de/151834/molecular-genetics

Education in Berlin
Genetics in Germany
Genetics or genomics research institutions
Molecular Genetics